Louvre Come Back to Me! is a 1962 Warner Bros. Looney Tunes cartoon directed by Chuck Jones. The short was released on August 18, 1962, and stars Pepé Le Pew in his last cartoon of the "classic" Warner Bros. animation age.

Plot
In Paris, Pepé is strolling and causing a disturbance with his fumes. At one point Penelope Pussycat is walking with a ginger cat and Pepé's stink causes the ginger cat to faint and Penelope to spring into the air in shock, her back making contact with a fresh white-painted flagpole before she falls right into Pepé's arms. As Pepé introduces himself, Penelope scurries away.

Pepé chases Penelope into the Louvre, with the ginger cat following. Pepé's stench ruins a couple of sculptures (correcting one into the Venus de Milo) as well as thwarting the ginger cat's ambush attempt (who Pepé mistakes for a sculpture due to him turning white; the cat's teeth, whiskers, tail, and nose fall off, which, after briefly fleeing, he comes back to sweep up before slinking off again) and he terrifies Penelope in the sculpture gallery, even as he paints a picture of her ("Don't move, darling. I want to remember you just as you are."), she scurries away again and Pepé "accidentally" paints the dust cloud she left onto his picture ("Aw, shucks... You moved!").

The ginger cat then pumps himself with air in an attempt to simultaneously look strong and muscular and hold his breath while he confronts Pepé. Pepé plays along with the confrontation as a duel, miming a miss and a defeat. The ginger cat in the meantime slowly suffocates and finally, the air he fights very hard to hold in is forced out, launching himself into the Hall d'Armour and trapping himself in a suit of armor. Pepé wonders where everyone has gone to and after remarking that "War is fine, but love is better", he immediately picks up on where Penelope went.

Pepé finds Penelope hiding in the air conditioning machine below the Louvre and, thinking she had found a trysting place for them, traps her in it with himself. Pepé's fumes spread through the Louvre spoiling various works of art (the limp watches on Salvador Dalí's The Persistence of Memory turn erect and break while the head and insects pass out, the heads of the couple on Grant Wood's American Gothic retreat into their bodies in the manner of turtles, the person overseeing the workers on Jean-François Millet's The Gleaners shoots a starting pistol causing the workers to dash off like sprinters, and the color on Edgar Degas's Two Dancers falls off turning it into a paint-by-numbers picture), the cartoon ending with the fumes causing the Mona Lisa to talk. She breaks the fourth wall and says  ("I can tell you chaps one thing. It's not always easy to hold this smile.").

Crew
Co-Director & Layouts: Maurice Noble
Story: John Dunn
Animation: Richard Thompson, Bob Bransford, Tom Ray & Ken Harris
Backgrounds: Tom O'Loughlin & Philip DeGuard
Film Editor: Treg Brown
Voice Characterizations: Mel Blanc & Julie Bennett
Music: Milt Franklyn
Produced by David H. DePatie & John W. Burton
Directed by Chuck Jones

Home media
 VHS - The Looney Tunes Video Show Vol. 3
 DVD - Looney Tunes Super Stars' Pepe Le Pew: Zee Best of Zee Best
 DVD - Daffy Duck's Fantastic Island

References

External links

 
 

1962 films
1962 animated films
1962 short films
Looney Tunes shorts
Warner Bros. Cartoons animated short films
Short films directed by Chuck Jones
Animated films about cats
Films directed by Maurice Noble
Films scored by Milt Franklyn
Pepé Le Pew films
Parodies of paintings
1960s Warner Bros. animated short films
1960s English-language films
Animated films set in Paris
Films set in museums
Penelope Pussycat films